Torver is a civil parish in the South Lakeland District of Cumbria, England. It contains ten listed buildings that are recorded in the National Heritage List for England.  Of these, one is listed at Grade II*, the middle of the three grades, and the others are at Grade II, the lowest grade.  The parish is in the Lake District National Park.  It contains the village of Torver, and is otherwise rural.  The listed buildings consist of farmhouses, farm buildings, a public house, and a church.


Key

Buildings

References

Citations

Sources

Lists of listed buildings in Cumbria